Jelle Goselink (born 31 July 1999) is a Dutch professional footballer who plays as a forward for Eerste Divisie club Helmond Sport.

Career
Born in Maarssenbroek, Goselink started his career at the academy of Almere City, before playing in the Derde Divisie and Tweede Divisie with Jong Almere City. Goselink made his debut for Almere City on 9 August 2019 in a 1–1 draw away to Roda JC Kerkrade in the Eerste Divisie.

He signed for Eerste Divisie side Helmond Sport on a season-long loan in September 2020. On 21 June 2021, he signed a permanent deal with the club; a two-year contract.

References

External links
 
 

1999 births
Living people
Dutch footballers
Association football forwards
People from Stichtse Vecht
USV Elinkwijk players
Almere City FC players
Helmond Sport players
Eerste Divisie players
Tweede Divisie players
Derde Divisie players
Footballers from Utrecht (province)